Jake Andrews (born 14 October 1997) is an English professional footballer who plays as a midfielder for National League North club Gloucester City.

Club career
On 31 January 2018, Andrews joined League Two side Cheltenham Town on loan until the end of the season. He made his English Football League debut as a substitute in Cheltenham's 5–1 victory over Port Vale, on 10 February 2018. 

Andrews is the cousin of former Bristol City, Birmingham City, Derby County, Cheltenham Town coach and current first team coach at Brighton & Hove Albion W.F.C. Alex Penny.

On 9 December 2021, Andrews joined National League South side Havant & Waterlooville on loan until the end of the 2021-22 season. Andrews was released at the end of the 2021–22 season.

On 28 June 2022, Andrews returned to Havant & Waterlooville on a permanent basis.

Career statistics

References

External links

1997 births
Living people
English footballers
Association football midfielders
Bristol City F.C. players
Guernsey F.C. players
Chippenham Town F.C. players
Cheltenham Town F.C. players
Torquay United F.C. players
Havant & Waterlooville F.C. players
Gloucester City A.F.C. players
English Football League players
National League (English football) players
Southern Football League players
Isthmian League players